The All India Council for Robotics & Automation is an Indian non-profit organization established in 2014 to promote and strengthen the robotics and artificial intelligence (AI) industry in India.

For the purpose, AICRA activities include setting up a center of excellence for AI, organizing robotics competitions to create awareness among youth, and creating records of robotics training.

References

2014 establishments in India
Non-profit organisations based in India